Roadworthiness or streetworthiness is a property or ability of a car, bus, truck or any kind of automobile to be in a suitable operating condition or meeting acceptable standards for safe driving and transport of people, baggage or cargo in roads or streets, being therefore street-legal.

Certificate of Roadworthiness
A Certificate of Roadworthiness (also known as a ‘roadworthy’ or ‘RWC’) attests that a vehicle is safe enough to be used on public roads. A roadworthy is required in the selling of a vehicle in some countries. It may also be required when the vehicle is re-registered, and to clear some problematic notices.

Roadworthy inspection
Roadworthy inspection is designed to check the vehicle to make sure that its important auto parts are in a good (not top) condition that is enough for safe road use. It includes:
 wheels and tires
 mirrors
 steering, suspensions and braking systems
 seats and seatbelts
 lights and reflectors
 windscreen, and windows including front wipers and washers
 vehicle structure
 other safety related items on the body, chassis or engine

Roadworthy inspection in Europe

In Europe, roadworthy inspection is regulated by regulation Directive 2014/45/EC on
Periodic Road-worthiness tests, Directive 2014/47/EC on technical roadside inspections of commercial vehicles and Directive 2014/46/EC.

Directive 2014/45/EC regulates the periodic testing for various kind of vehicles:
 transport of people (M1, M2, M3)
 transport of good (N1, N2, N3)
 trailers of more than 3.5 tonnes (O3, O3)
 tractors of category T5
 since January 2022,  two- or three-wheel vehicles in categories L3e, L4e, L5e and L7e, with an engine displacement of more than 125 cm3.

18 of 27 EU member states have required motorcycle owners to have their vehicles checked
for road-worthiness.

The directive 2014/45/EC defines obligations and responsibilities,  minimum requirements concerning road-worthiness tests, administrative provisions and cooperation and exchange of information.

Minimum requirements concerning road-worthiness tests encompass date and frequency of testing, contents and methods of testing, assessment of deficiencies, road-worthiness certificate, follow-up of deficiencies and proof of test.

See also

Airworthiness
Crashworthiness
Cyberworthiness
Railworthiness
Seaworthiness
Spaceworthiness
Street-legal vehicle
Vehicle inspection

Reference list

Transport law
Mechanical engineering
Motor vehicle maintenance